Sayed Muzaffar Hussain Burney (14 August 1924 – 7 February 2014) was a civil servant, governor of the states of Tripura, Nagaland, Haryana and Himachal Pradesh and a chairman of the National Minorities Commission.

Burney was an alumnus of the Bareilly College in Uttar Pradesh. He was an officer of the Indian Administrative Services of the Orissa cadre where he went on to become the chief secretary of the state. Between 1981 and 1984, he served as the governor of Nagaland, Tripura and Manipur and from 1987 to 1988, as the Governor of Himachal Pradesh and Haryana. He was also a member and later chairman of the Fourth and Fifth  Minority Commissions from 1988 to 1992 and was the chancellor of the Jamia Millia Islamia University in Delhi from 1990 to 1995.

Burney authored the work Iqbal: Poet – Patriot of India.

References 

1924 births
20th-century Indian Muslims
2014 deaths
Governors of Tripura
Governors of Nagaland
Governors of Haryana
Governors of Manipur
Governors of Himachal Pradesh
Indian civil servants